The Alligator Eyes are two adjacent nunataks that rise to over  on the east side of Dickey Glacier in the Churchill Mountains of Antarctica. They surmount the end of the broad ice-covered ridge that extends north from Mount Arcone, and were so named by the Advisory Committee on Antarctic Names because of their apparent resemblance to the eyes of an alligator.

See also
Nunatak

References
 

Nunataks of the Ross Dependency
Shackleton Coast